Black Island is an island and former settlement in Newfoundland and Labrador.

See also
 List of ghost towns in Newfoundland and Labrador

Ghost towns in Newfoundland and Labrador